Hande Doğandemir (born 22 November 1985) is a Turkish actress, TV host and sociologist. She is best known for her role as Zeynep Yılmaz Sayer on Kanal D series Güneşi Beklerken.

Doğandemir, is also known for her supporting roles as "Elem" in surreal drama series Şubat, as "Turhan Sultan" in Muhteşem Yüzyıl: Kösem, as "Şans" in the surreal comedy series Leyla ile Mecnun and in film "Nuh Tepesi" of Tribeca Film Festivale.

Life and career
Her maternal family is of Circassian descent. She graduated from Ankara University, Department of Sociology. In her senior year in university, she went to Lille, France, with ERASMUS programme. She speaks French and English fluently. Doğandemir began in production for communication sociology. She simultaneously worked as an actress, editor and host. 

She came to attention for her Browni Intense commercial with Nejat İşler.She and Nejat İşler later played together in film "Kaybedenler Kulübü: Yolda".

She played with same actors again. With Alican Yücesoy, she played in "Sen de Gitme", "Şubat", "Can Kırıkları" and "Hükümsüz". With Seçkin Özdemir, She played in "Racon" and "Can Kırıkları". With İsmail Hacıoğlu, she played in "Hükümsüzler" and "49". With Ali Atay, she played in "Nuh Tepesi" and "Leyla ile Mecnun". With Kutsi, She played in "Kahramanlar" and "Annemizi Saklarken".

Doğandemir made her cinematic debut with Bana Masal Anlatma, a film directed and written by Burak Aksak.

Also, she played leading roles alongside İbrahim Çelikkol, Barış Arduç, Şükrü Özyıldız, Engin Öztürk, Serkan Çayoğlu.

Filmography

Film

Series

Tv host

Theatre
Waterproof (2019)

Awards

References

External links
 

1985 births
Living people
Actresses from Istanbul
Turkish television actresses
Alumni of the Erasmus Programme
Ankara University alumni